The soldier flies (Stratiomyidae, sometimes misspelled as Stratiomyiidae, from Greek  - soldier;  - fly) are a family of flies (historically placed in the now-obsolete group Orthorrhapha). The family contains over 2,700 species in over 380 extant genera worldwide. Adults are found near larval habitats, which are found in a wide array of locations, mostly in wetlands, damp places in soil, sod, under bark, in animal excrement, and in decaying organic matter. The Stratiomyinae are a different subgroup that tends to have an affinity to aquatic environments. They are diverse in size and shape, though they commonly are partly or wholly metallic green, or somewhat wasplike mimics, marked with black and yellow or green and sometimes metallic. They are often rather inactive flies which typically rest with their wings placed one above the other over the abdomen.

Etymology
In English, the Stratiomidi are commonly called soldier flies, in German Waffenfliegen ("armed flies"). In the Italian language, Duméril (1832) used the common names term stratiomidi and mosche armate in the  Dizionario delle Scienze Naturali (Dictionary of Natural Sciences). The name might originate from thoracic spines of adults that resemble armor or striped larvae that resemble uniformed soldiers.

Characteristics
These flies are very small to large (3–20 mm long). They have antennae in three segments, with the terminal segment annulated. Ocelli are present; the lower orbital bristles are absent. The postvertical orbital bristles are absent, as are the vibrissae. As for the mouthparts, the proboscis is short and not piercing; the maxillary palps are mono- or bisegmented. The wings have either a small discal cell, or the discal cell is absent. No subapical cell is seen, and a closed anal cell is present. The costa does not extend around the entire wing. The subcosta reaches the costa independently of vein 1, or joins vein 1 close to where it joins the costa. The leading-edge veins are often markedly stronger than the rest; vein 6 is present and reaches the wing margin, whereas vein 7 is present and does not reach the wing margin. The tibiae are without spurs.

Larvae and pupae
Larvae may be either aquatic or terrestrial. In regards to feeding, they may be saprophagous, mycophagous, or predatory. The larvae are apodous and eucephalic and cylindrical-fusiform, depressed dorsoventrally and distinctly segmented. The size of the mature larva is variable, depending on the species, from less than 1 cm in length up to 5 cm. The head is much narrower than the thorax and partially sunken into it. The integument is strongly sclerotized with the cuticle containing inclusions of calcium carbonate with hexagonal crystals which form a characteristic microsculpture. In aquatic species, the last urite is thin and more or less elongated forming  a breathing tube,  which ends with a tuft of waterproofing bristles. It is used to draw air from the surface, with the larva remaining submerged. 

The pupa develops inside the exuvia of the last larval stage, a feature common to all Stratiomyomorpha. The pupation within the larval exuvia constitutes a case of evolutionary convergence with Cyclorrhapha , in which group  is the formation of a true puparium .

Biology
The larvae of Stratiomyidae  are characterized by a wide variety of behaviours and habitats. They are mainly scavengers, but aquatic species also feed on algae. Less frequently, they may be predators or herbivores. The aquatic larvae are sometimes characterized by particularly specific habitat requirements. For example, several species colonize rocks covered by a thin layer of water (hygropetric); others are found in brackish water, and some in thermal springs. In general, though, Stratiomyidae larvae colonize stagnant waters or rivers near the shores, seeking the richest vegetation, algae, and debris.

Terrestrial larvae are found in organic substrates: in decomposing vegetable matter and animal excreta, in moist soils and litter, under the bark of trees, etc. Inopus rubriceps (Macquart), the sugarcane soldier fly, is a pest: the larvae attack the roots of sugarcane in Australia.

Adults visit flowers to feed on the sugar-containing nectar, or else do not feed at all, dedicating their short lives to reproduction. Unlike other dipterous scavengers, adults of Stratiomyidae do not have relationships with the growth substrate of the larvae, except for oviposition.

Larval development takes place with a variable number of moults; depending on the species, up to 10 larval stages occur. Particularly well known is the postembryonic development of Hermetia illucens, whose larvae develop through six stages.

Species of this fly may travel along with members of Polybioides raphigastra (a wasp species) through the practice of mimicry.

Systematics
The Stratiomyidae are closely related to the family of Xylomyidae, with which they share 10 synapomorphies, and they form a monophyletic clade  with the family of Pantophthalmidae  with which they share 5 synapomorphies.

References

Further reading
 Literature for world fauna
 Woodley, N. E., 2001. A World Catalog of the Stratiomyidae (Insecta: Diptera). Myia 11: 1-473. Backhuys Publishers, Leiden

 Literature for Palaearctic fauna
 Lindner, E., 1938, Vol 18. Stratiomyiidae. In: Lindner, E. (ed.): Die Fliegen der Paläarktischen Region. Stuttgart, 4(1):1-218.
 Dusek J. and Rozkosny R. 1963-1967 Revision mitteleuropäischer Arten der Familie Stratiomyidae (Diptera) mit besonderer Berücksichtigung der Fauna der CSSR. 60 (1963) : 201-221; 61 (1964) :360-373; 62 (1965): 24-60; 64 (1967): 140-165.
 Acta entomologica bohemoslovaca 71: 322-341 + 1 Tafel.; Prag. Keys to subfamilies, genera and species. In German.
 Nartshuk, E. P., 1988, 36. Family Stratiomyidae. Part I Diptera and Siphanoptera (In: Bei-Benko, G. Ya.,) Mycetobiidae-Therevidae. Keys to The Insect of European Part of The USSR. Russia, Vol. 5(2): 700-738.
 Rozkošný, R., 1973, Stratiomyidae of Denmark and Fennoscandia. Lyneborg L. (ed.). Denmark, pp:1-139.
 Rozkošný, R., 1982, A Biosystematic Study of The European Stratiomyidae (Diptera). Vol.1. Introduction, Beridinae, Sarginae and Stratiomyinae. Series Entomologica, 21. Dr.W. Junk, The Hague, pp. 1–401.
 Rozkošný, R., 1983, A Biosystematic Study of The European Stratiomyidae (Diptera). Vol.2. Clitellariinae, Hermetiinae, Pachygasterinae and Bibliography. Series Entomologica, 25. Dr.W. Junk, The Hague, pp. 1–431.
 Rozkošný, R., Nartshuk, E. P., 1988, Family Stratiomyidae. In: Soós, Á. & Papp, L. (eds.): Catalogue of Palearctic Diptera. Amsterdam & Akadémiai Kiadó, Budapest, pp 42–96.

 Literature for Afrotropical fauna
 Hauser, M., Woodley, N.E. and Fachin, D.A. (2017). "Chapter 41. Stratiomyidae (Soldier Flies)". In Kirk-Spriggs, A.H. & Sinclair, B.J. (ed.). Manual of Afrotropical Diptera. Pretoria, South Africa. ISBN 978-1-928224-11-2.

External links

 Tree of Life: Stratiomyidae
 Picture gallery from Diptera.info 195 photographs
  Picture gallery from BugGuide
  Family Stratiomyidae at EOL Images. Flowers visited by adults.
 Pest Information Wiki

Species lists 
 Palaearctic
 Nearctic
 Australasian/Oceanian
 Japan

 
Brachycera families
Articles containing video clips
Taxa named by Pierre André Latreille